"GBI (German Bold Italic)" is a 1997 song by Japanese-American music producer Towa Tei, featuring vocals from Australian singer Kylie Minogue, Japanese musician Haruomi Hosono, and co-written by Tei and Minogue. It is the lead single from Tei's second studio album, Sound Museum (1997), released by Arthrob in the United Kingdom. The song is a "minimalist" house-techno track with lyrics portrayed Minogue as a typeface called "German Bold Italic", with her vocals performed in a tongue-in-cheek style.

Many critics praise the song for its distinctiveness within Minogue's catalogue, while others consider the track to be one of the important artistic moves that define her musical career. Commercially, the song was one of Minogue's least successful track on the charts. It peaked at number 50 in Australia and failed to reach top 50 in the United Kingdom, where it reached number 63. However, it was said to be a minor hit in Tei's home country, Japan.

The song's music video was directed by French director Stéphane Sednaoui and inspired by a mutual appreciation of Japanese culture between him and Minogue. It features scenes of Minogue dressed as a geisha walking through New York City streets.

The song was later added to Tei's first greatest hits album Best (2001), and also appears on his 11th studio album EMO (2017).

Background and composition
In 1996, coming back to a studio in Sangenjaya, Setagaya, Japan after going for drinks, Tei received a hand-written fax that had "a picture of some sort" on it that said: "Music with you! Kylie. Call Me". Minogue then came to Japan to perform and met Tei; they tried to make some songs for her album at Sangenjaya. The results of the session were "GBI (German Bold Italic)" and a demo of "Sometime Samurai".

"GBI" then made its appearance on Tei's second studio album Sound Museum (1997), while "Sometime Samurai" was later re-recorded by Minogue in 2003 and appeared on Tei's fifth album Flash (2005). Tei then shared that her vocal contributions was one of the things he was "happiest" about the album. "She is the ideal icon that appeals to both Japanese and Western people," said Tei. "She is very much a part of the club scene already, particularly among the gay community, and she looks amazing."

The song is about a typeface named "German Bold Italic", with Minogue playing the part of the typeface, singing such lyrics as "My name is German Bold Italic. I am a typeface which you have never heard of before."

At the time, Minogue was attempting to break away from the Eurobeat genre. Minogue can be heard talking and giggling over a "minimalist" house-techno track.

The song opens with a sample from the introduction track of the album The Art of Belly Dancing by Bel-Sha-Zaar, Tommy Genapopoluis and The Grecian Knights, a sample that was also used on "Groove Is in the Heart", Tei's previous collaboration with his group Deee-Lite.

Reception
The Independent Fiona Sturges got the feeling that Minogue made use of Tei's "far-reaching" reputation, rather than the other way around. However, she also noticed a "significantly more exotic flavour" than Tei's "customary club anthems". Writing in his book Playlisted: Everything You Need to Know About Australian Music Right Now, Australian music journalist Craig Mathieson claimed that before Minogue's transformation to "Can't Get You Out of My Head", "there's a fascinating precursor, a glimpse of what's to come" in the track. He also commented that "such definite specifications [of "GBI"] suited her." Sean Smith, the writer of Minogue's biography Kylie, said the track is arguably her "weirdest song" but pointed out that by the time of the single's release, Minogue had "moved on artistically". Mayer Nissim from Digital Spy called the collaboration a "completely barmy hook-up" and listed as one of Minogue's career-defining moments. The song was said to be the most "avant-garde" and "obscure" single in her catalogue. Robbie Daw from Idolator called the track one of Minogue's most "quirky" collaborations. NME Priya Elan called it one of her fan-favourite collaborative works that are lesser known. Johannes Schardt from Germany design studio Precious listed the track at number 2 in his top 7 songs with typographic references in 2008. DJ Calvin Harris told UK music website Popjustice the song was his favorite track from Minogue, calling it "fucking hilarious" and claiming: "It's why I love Kylie, because she does exactly what she wants to do."

Release
The song was said to be a "minor" hit in Tei's native Japan.

Meanwhile, Minogue herself was going through a difficult point in her career, with critics praising her musical ventures on Deconstruction Records, but the public were failing to warm to it, particularly the Impossible Princess album.

The CD single also features bonus CD-ROM programming including a screen saver, the German Bold Italic font and sound bites from the song.

The Krust remix, alongside another remix called "GBI (Latin Narrow Light)" by Uwe Schmidt (credited under his alias "Lisa Carbon"), made their appearances on Tei's Japanese remix album Stupid Fresh (1997). This album was later released as the second disc to Sound Museum in Europe. The song was later added to Tei's first greatest hits album Best (2001).

Typeface
The font included as one of the bonus features on the CD single and the enhanced CD version of Sound Museum, and can be seen on the single cover. It was designed by Tei's long-time collaborative design team, Tycoon Graphics for Graphickers. The font was available for download on Tei's and Minogue's official websites. In 2015, American artist Cory Arcangel used the font for a merchandising sweatshirt of the group Wet and claimed he had been "crazy" for the font since it came out. "It's a sick classic vector techno font, and super rare these days," he told The Fader. He then used it several times for artworks, including some drawings at his 2011 exhibition at Whitney Museum of American Art. "I've always wanted to use it to make a shirt for a pop group... one pop group used to advertise the next."

Music video
The music video for "GBI (German Bold Italic)" was directed by Minogue's then-boyfriend, French director Stéphane Sednaoui. Before shooting the video, Minogue and Sednaoui often traveled to Japan and were very into anime. Inspired by a mutual appreciation of Japanese culture, they created a visual combination of "geisha and manga superheroine" for the photographs taken for Minogue's sixth album Impossible Princess and the video for the track also. The low-budget video was shot in New York City with a "small video camera". Minogue told German publication Die Welt: "In Japan, all the kids ran with such cameras around the city. So we then did just the same in New York."

The video opens with Minogue in a bathtub, wearing a red bikini with a geisha headdress, telling viewers "You will like my sense of style". It then follows her in geisha regalia and make-up throughout New York City streets. Towards the climax of the video, Minogue is leashed and led around by a Japanese man.

Wearing the geisha outfit was said by Minogue to be "insanely stressful", with her wig being called "a nightmare". "Everything was true to the original. Only the stylist came from China," she said.

The concept was similar to Sednaoui's previous directorial work on the video "Sly" from the English trip hop group Massive Attack in 1994, with a singer also appearing dressed as a geisha in the streets of New York in "Sly".

The video was considered to be one of Minogue's most "bizarre" music videos, although The Independent wrote that Minogue was "looking suitably sweet" in the video. Journalist Craig Mathieson claimed the video might be her greatest performance in "a career plagued by lackluster acting", and writer Sean Smith described the video was even more "surreal" than the track. "This was many years before Lady Gaga raided the dressing-up box and further proof of Kylie's groundbreaking work in the nineties."

The video has never been released commercially on any DVD.

Japanese graphic designer group Enlightenment, who created the icon illustration for the single cover, released a lyric video of the track in 2013.

Live performances

An excerpt of the track appeared during Minogue's medley performance at the 25th Anniversary Mushroom Records concert held on November 14, 1998, at the Melbourne Cricket Ground. This performance later appeared on its live album called Mushroom 25 Live. It was also included on her 2002 tour KylieFever2002 as a video interlude. A show in Manchester was filmed on May 4, 2002, and released on DVD titled KylieFever2002: Live in Manchester. The song was later sampled on "Sometimes Samurai", a visual from her 2008 concert tour KylieX2008. A picture taken from the shooting of the visual was released earlier for the promotion of the tour.

Formats and track listings

UK CD single #1
"GBI" (Radio Edit) – 3:31
"GBI" (The Sharp Boys Deee-Liteful Dub) – 8:58
"Boldline" – 2:40

UK CD single #2
"GBI" (Radio Edit) – 3:31
"GBI" (Rekut) – 8:15
"GBI" (Ebony Boogie Down Mix) – 5:14

UK cassette single
"GBI" (Radio Edit) – 3:31
"GBI (German Bold Italic)" – 6:58

Australia and Japan CD single
"Intro" – 0:26
"GBI" (Radio Edit) – 4:17
"GBI" (Ebony Boogie Down Mix) – 5:14
"BMT" (SP-1200 Remix) (featuring Biz Markie and Mos Def) – 4:23
"GBI" (Rekut) – 8:15
"GBI" (German Bold Light Mix) – 2:49

 Japan double 12" single
"GBI" (Radio Edit) – 4:17
"GBI" (Kylie-pella) – 1:40
"BMT" (SP-1200 Remix) (featuring Biz Markie and Mos Def) – 4:23
"Boldline" – 2:40
"GBI" (Ebony Boogie Down Mix) – 5:14
"GBI" (Rekut) – 8:15

Credits and personnel
All credits and personnel adapted from the song's CD single liner notes:

 Towa Tei – songwriter, producer, arranger, editor, drum and keyboard programing, art director
 Kylie Minogue – vocals, songwriter
 Haruomi Hosono – vocals
 Fernando Aponte – mixing engineer
 Bobby Hata – mastering engineer
 Tycoon Graphics for Graphickers – art director, designer
 Hiro Sugiyama (Enlightenment) for Graphickers – icon illustrator

Charts

Release history

References

1997 singles
1997 songs
Kylie Minogue songs
Music videos directed by Stéphane Sednaoui
Songs written by Kylie Minogue
Songs written by Towa Tei
Towa Tei songs
Display typefaces